"Never Forget You" is a song performed by American singer Mariah Carey. It was co-written by Carey and Babyface. It was produced by Carey, Babyface, and Daryl Simmons for Carey's third studio album, Music Box (1993). It was released as the third single from Music Box in the first quarter of 1994 on January 18 by Columbia Records, as a double A-side with a cover of Badfinger's "Without You". A month later, it was released as the album's fourth single on February 22, 1994. Lyrically, the song's protagonist describes her ex-lover and although they have since moved on, she will never forget them. The song was remixed for single release by Jermaine Dupri, who has since collaborated with Carey on several tracks on almost all her albums since Daydream (1995). No music video was commissioned for the song, making it Carey's first commercially released single not to be accompanied by a video.

Chart performance
At the time of the single's release in the U.S. as "Without You/Never Forget You," Billboard magazine's rules allowed double-sided singles to chart together as one entry on the singles chart. A song that picked up the most airplay and/or sales for the respective chart was listed as the A-side. On the U.S. pop charts, it was listed as "Without You/Never Forget You" and reached number three on the Billboard Hot 100, remaining in the top forty for 21 weeks.

The maxi-single of "Never Forget You" was only released in the United States and promoted to Urban radio audiences, charting as the A-side when it appeared on the R&B charts.  As "Never Forget You/Without You," it reached the top ten on Billboards Hot R&B Singles chart primarily due to sales, and the RIAA certified it gold.

Critical reception
Larry Flick from Billboard described "Never Forget You" as a "softly rhythmic pop/R&B slow jam, equipped with a deliciously catchy chorus and wonderful booming instrumentation." He added, "Carey's vocal is sweetly sincere as she ponders a love affair that has come to an end. Another sparkling moment from the diva's current Music Box opus." Bill Speed and John Martinucci from the Gavin Report called it "a ballad that puts you into a sentimental mood before you can say "I like this.""

Remixes and other versions
Jermaine Dupri's R&B remixes of the song are included on its maxi-single release. A radio edit, an extended version and the instrumental version of the remix replace Babyface's original production with a new, pulsating synthetic R&B rhythm. The instrumental version was used on Carey's episode of MTV Cribs. The song has been covered by a Japanese R&B singer Double and is featured on her greatest hits album 10 Years Best: We R&B.

On August 7, 2020, along with the celebration of the 30th-anniversary of Carey's debut studio album Mariah Carey (1990), the song was released as a three-track extended play, titled Never Forget You EP, which contained the remixes from the US CD maxi-single – excluding the song's album version and the track "Without You".

Track listing
 U.S. CD maxi-single"Never Forget You" (Radio Edit) – 3:38
"Never Forget You" (Extended) – 5:19
"Never Forget You" (Album Version) – 3:48
"Never Forget You" (Instrumental) – 3:35
"Without You" (Album Version) – 3:33

 Never Forget You EP'
"Never Forget You" (Radio Edit) – 3:38
"Never Forget You" (Extended) – 5:19
"Never Forget You" (Instrumental) – 3:35

Charts and certifications

Weekly charts

Year-end charts

Certifications and sales

|}

References

1990s ballads
1994 singles
Mariah Carey songs
Pop ballads
Contemporary R&B ballads
Songs written by Mariah Carey
Songs written by Babyface (musician)
Song recordings produced by Babyface (musician)
Song recordings produced by Daryl Simmons
1993 songs
Columbia Records singles
Sony Music singles
Songs about loneliness